The 2020 Team Bath netball season will see Team Bath play in the 2020 Netball Superleague.

Squad

Preseason

Fast5 Netball All-Stars Championship
On 12 October 2019, Team Bath played in the Fast5 Netball All-Stars Championship. They were knocked out in the double elimination stage after losing two games.

Double Elimination Stage

The Big Showdown
Team Bath relaunched their pre-season Tri-Tournament as The Big Showdown. The number of entrants was expanded from three to six. The winners were also awarded the Lyn Gunson Trophy, named after the former Team Bath and England head coach, Lyn Gunson. After winning five of their six group stage games, Team Bath qualified for the final but lost 33–27 to Saracens Mavericks.
Day One

Day Two

Final

Mike Greenwood Trophy
Team Bath played three games at the 2019 Mike Greenwood Trophy tournament, winning one and losing two.

Regular season

Fixtures and results

Table

Team Bath end-of-season awards

References

2020 Netball Superleague season
2020